Cyperus penicillatus is a species of sedge that is native to south western parts of Mexico.

See also 
 List of Cyperus species

References 

penicillatus
Plants described in 1946
Flora of Mexico